Dead to Me is an American black comedy television series created by Liz Feldman and executively produced by Feldman, Will Ferrell, Adam McKay, and Jessica Elbaum. The series premiered on May 3, 2019, on Netflix and stars Christina Applegate and Linda Cardellini as two grieving women who bond during therapy. The first season received positive reviews. In June 2019, Netflix renewed the series for a second season which was released on May 8, 2020. At the 71st Primetime Emmy Awards, Applegate received a nomination for Outstanding Lead Actress in a Comedy Series.

In July 2020, the series was renewed for a third and final season. Due to the COVID-19 pandemic, production of the third season was delayed until mid-2021, and was then further delayed by Applegate's multiple sclerosis diagnosis. The third and final season was released on November 17, 2022.

At the 72nd Primetime Emmy Awards, the show received four nominations including Primetime Emmy Award for Outstanding Comedy Series and two Primetime Emmy Award for Outstanding Lead Actress in a Comedy Series for Applegate and Cardellini.

Premise
Dead to Me is about a friendship that blossoms between Jen (Applegate) and Judy (Cardellini). Jen is a recently widowed real estate agent based in Laguna Beach, California, trying to come to terms with her loss through therapy, exercise, and other methods. She uses anger and resentment as an outlet for her grief. She meets Judy in a grief support group. Jen mourns her husband, who was killed by a hit-and-run driver, while Judy claims that she is grieving for her fiancé who died of a heart attack. In actuality, Judy is the hit-and-run driver whose fiancé broke up with her. The two characters face their struggles differently, as Jen finds herself in a dark place while Judy maintains a positive disposition. This difference quickly leads to a deep bond between the two. Jen becomes more unhinged as she unravels the mystery of her husband's death and Judy's secrets.

Cast and characters

Main
 Christina Applegate as Jen Harding, a realtor whose husband Ted was killed by a hit-and-run driver shortly before the start of the series
 Linda Cardellini as Judy Hale, a woman Jen meets at a grief support group who befriends her; she is the hit-and-run driver
 James Marsden as 
 Steve Wood (season 1), Judy's emotionally abusive ex-fiancé, an attorney involved with the Greek Mafia
 Ben Wood (seasons 2–3), Steve's (almost) identical twin brother, a chiropractor, and Jen's new love interest
 Max Jenkins as Christopher Doyle (seasons 1–2, recurring season 3), Jen's real estate business partner and friend
 Sam McCarthy as Charlie Harding, Jen's older son
 Luke Roessler as Henry Harding, Jen's younger son

Recurring
 Diana-Maria Riva as Ana Perez, the police detective in charge of the hit-and-run case
 Brandon Scott as Nick Prager, a police detective on administrative leave whom Judy meets at the grieving retreat
 Valerie Mahaffey as Lorna Harding, Jen's mother-in-law and Ted's mother
 Natalie Morales as Michelle (seasons 2–3), Judy's love interest and Ana's ex-girlfriend
 Ed Asner as Abe Rifkin (season 1), Judy's friend from the retirement home where she works
 Keong Sim as Pastor Wayne, Jen and Judy's grief support group leader
 Telma Hopkins as Yolanda, a member of the grief support group
 Sadie Stanley as Parker (season 2), Charlie's brief love interest and self-proclaimed social media micro-influencer
 Haley Sims as Kayley, Steve's assistant
 Blair Beeken as Wendy, a member of the grief support group
 Edward Fordham Jr. as Kyle, a member of the grief support group
 Frances Conroy as Eileen Wood (seasons 2–3), Steve and Ben's mother
 Suzy Nakamura as Karen, Jen's neighbor, who is obsessed with protecting her house and preparing for the apocalypse.
 Jere Burns as Howard Hastings (season 2), a corrupt police chief who is working with the Greek Mafia
 Garret Dillahunt as Glenn Moranis (season 3), an FBI agent who is investigating Steve's death and ties to the Greek Mafia

Guest
 Olivia Macklin as Bambi (season 1), a waitress and Ted's mistress
 Steve Howey as Jason (season 1), a widower Jen meets at a grief retreat
 Tara Karsian as Erica Brewer (season 1), Charlie's principal
 Lily Knight as Linda, a member of the grief support group
 Tom Virtue as Doug (season 1), a potential client of Jen's
 Beth Littleford as Doug's wife (season 1)
 Adora Soleil Bricher as Shandy Adams, a girl in Henry's class who finds Ted's body
 Chelsea Spack as Heidi (seasons 1-2), Steve's new girlfriend, and employee at TKG Arts
 Rick Holmes as Andrew Peters (seasons 1-2), a man Jen suspects of killing her husband
 Marc Evan Jackson as Jeff (seasons 2–3), Karen's husband who is gay and having an affair
 Katey Sagal as Eleanor Hale (seasons 2–3), Judy's drug-addicted and emotionally abusive mother

Episodes

Season 1 (2019)

Season 2 (2020)

Season 3 (2022)

Production

Development
On April 5, 2018, it was announced that Netflix had given the production a series order for a first season consisting of ten episodes. The series was created by Liz Feldman who was also expected to write for the series and executive produce alongside Will Ferrell, Adam McKay, and Jessica Elbaum. Production companies involved with the series were slated to consist of Gloria Sanchez Productions and CBS Television Studios. On November 2, 2018, it was reported that Amy York Rubin would direct the first and second episodes of the series.

On April 1, 2019, it was announced that the series was set to be released on May 3, 2019. On June 3, 2019, the series was renewed for a second season, set to be released in 2020. On April 10, 2020, Netflix announced that the second season would be released on May 8, 2020. On July 6, 2020, Netflix renewed the series for a third and final season. Filming for the third and final season began on May 7, 2021; however, in August, 2021, production was paused temporarily due to Applegate’s health. On December 21, 2021, it was reported that there were positive COVID-19 cases on the set, but filming was not impacted or shut down. There were three weeks of filming left to conclude in early 2022, but filming did not wrap until April 25, 2022. The third and final season premiered on November 17, 2022.

Casting
On July 11, 2018, it was announced that Christina Applegate had been cast in one of the series' two lead roles. On August 3, 2018, it was reported that Linda Cardellini had been cast in the series' other lead role. A week later, it was announced that Max Jenkins and Luke Roessler had been cast in series regular roles. On September 12, 2018, it was reported that James Marsden and Ed Asner had been cast in starring roles. In October 2018, it was announced that Sam McCarthy had joined the cast in a series regular capacity and that Diana-Maria Riva had been cast in a recurring role. In October 2019, Natalie Morales was cast in the recurring role of Michelle on the second season.

Reception

Critical response
On review aggregator website Rotten Tomatoes, the first season has an approval rating of 86% based on 50 reviews, with an average rating of 6.5/10. The website's critics consensus reads: "Dead to Me doesn't always deliver on the gallows humor that it promises, but the sterling duo of Christina Applegate and Linda Cardellini elevates the series above its pulpier aspects—offering a deeply moving relationship shaped by mutual grief." On Metacritic, it has a weighted average score of 67 out of 100, based on 21 critics, indicating "generally favorable reviews".

On Rotten Tomatoes, the second season has an approval rating of 94% based on 48 reviews, with an average rating of 7.6/10. The website's critics consensus reads: "Dead to Me doubles down on the twists and turns out an exciting second season that makes excellent use of its well-matched leads." On Metacritic, it has a weighted average score of 72 out of 100, based on 10 critics, indicating "generally favorable reviews".

On Rotten Tomatoes, the third season holds an approval rating of 82% based on 17 reviews, with an average rating of 6.1/10. The website's critics consensus reads: "Dead to Me's final season has some diminishing returns as the twists begin to feel overplayed, but Christina Applegate and Linda Cardellini remain a compelling duo who viewers will want to stick with to the bitter end." On Metacritic, it has a weighted average score of 70 out of 100, based on 7 critics, indicating "generally favorable reviews".

Viewership
On July 17, 2019, Netflix announced that the series was on track to be streamed by over 30 million viewers within its first month of release on the streaming platform.

Accolades

References

External links
 
 

2010s American black comedy television series
2010s American comedy-drama television series
2010s American mystery television series
2019 American television series debuts
2020s American black comedy television series
2020s American comedy-drama television series
2020s American mystery television series
2022 American television series endings
English-language Netflix original programming
Grief in fiction
Murder in television
Television productions postponed due to the COVID-19 pandemic
Television series about widowhood
Television series by CBS Studios
Television series by Gloria Sanchez Productions
Television shows set in Orange County, California